Kimberley "Kim" Mulhall (born 9 January 1991) is an Australian discus thrower and former shot putter who competes in international elite events. She is an Oceanian champion in the discus throw and has competed at the Commonwealth Games twice.

References

1991 births
Living people
Athletes from Melbourne
Australian female shot putters
Australian female discus throwers
Athletes (track and field) at the 2014 Commonwealth Games
Athletes (track and field) at the 2018 Commonwealth Games
Competitors at the 2013 Summer Universiade
21st-century Australian women
People from Bentleigh, Victoria
Sportswomen from Victoria (Australia)